The Vineland Handicap was an American Thoroughbred horse race run at Garden State Park Racetrack in Cherry Hill, New Jersey. Open to horses age three and older, it was contested on turf over a distance of a mile and a sixteenth.

Inaugurated in 1942, the Vineland Handicap was last run in 1999 when that year's American Champion Female Turf Horse, Soaring Softly won. On March 18, 2000, the Philadelphia Inquirer reported that the Vineland Handicap had been cancelled due to financial restraints.  The track closed in 2001.

References

 September 13, 1942 New York Times report on the inaugural running of the Vineland Handicap

Horse races in the United States
Discontinued horse races in the United States
Horse races in New Jersey
Garden State Park Racetrack
Recurring sporting events established in 1942
Recurring sporting events disestablished in 1999
1942 establishments in New Jersey
1999 disestablishments in New Jersey